Overtime is a 2014 Philippine suspense-thriller film directed by Wincy Aquino Ong and Earl Ignacio. The film stars Richard Gutierrez and Lauren Young.

Cast
 Richard Gutierrez as Dom Garcia
 Lauren Young as Jody Amistoso
 Roi Vinzon as Vicente Alonzo
 Mitch Valdez as Lola Vi
 Bearwin Meily as Raffy San Diego
 Roadfill as Bhoy Tinapay
 Renz Valerio as Brian Amistoso
 William Martinez as Jody's Father
 Yayo Aguila as Jody's Mother
 Edwin Reyes as Police Chief
 Ruby Ruiz as Officemate
 Frencheska Farr as SPO2 Montoya
 Adrian Ramirez as Janitor
 Dreps Tatad as Reporter
 Earl Ignacio as Guard
 Wincy Aquino Ong as Angry Driver

References

External links
Official Page

2014 films
Filipino-language films
Philippine thriller films
GMA Pictures films